Fyodorovsky District (Fyodorovka rayonı) is an administrative and municipal district (raion), one of the fifty-four in the Republic of Bashkortostan, Russia. It is located in the southwest of the republic and borders with Sterlibashevsky District in the north, Meleuzovsky District in the east, Kuyurgazinsky District in the south, and with Orenburg Oblast in the west. Its administrative center is the rural locality (a selo) of Fyodorovka. As of the 2010 Census, the total population of the district was 18,650, with the population of Fyodorovka accounting for 23.1% of that number.

History
The district was established in 1935.

Administrative and municipal status
Within the framework of administrative divisions, Fyodorovsky District is one of the fifty-four in the Republic of Bashkortostan. The district is divided into fourteen selsoviets, comprising sixty-eight rural localities. As a municipal division, the district is incorporated as Fyodorovsky Municipal District. Its fourteen selsoviets are incorporated as fourteen rural settlements within the municipal district. The selo of Fyodorovka serves as the administrative center of both the administrative and municipal district.

References

Notes

Sources

Districts of Bashkortostan
States and territories established in 1935
 
